Grishevka is a rural locality (a khutor) in Grishevskoye Rural Settlement, Podgorensky District, Voronezh Oblast, Russia. The population was 53 as of 2010.

Geography 
Grishevka is located 15 km northwest of Podgorensky (the district's administrative centre) by road. Stepanovka is the nearest rural locality.

References 

Rural localities in Podgorensky District